"Two Fingers" is a song by British singer songwriter Jake Bugg. It was released as the fifth single from his self-titled debut album (2012). It was released as a digital download in the United Kingdom on 7 September 2012. The song peaked at number 28 on the UK Singles Chart. The song premiered on BBC Radio 1 as Zane Lowe's 'Hottest Record In The World' on 3 September 2012.

Music video
A music video to accompany the release of "Two Fingers" was first released onto YouTube on 23 September 2012 at a total length of three minutes and forty-four seconds. The video was directed by Jamie Thraves.

Track listings

Charts and certifications

Certifications

Release history

References

2012 songs
Jake Bugg songs
2012 singles
Songs written by Jake Bugg
Songs written by Iain Archer
Mercury Records singles